Dorcadion nigrosparsum is a species of beetle in the family Cerambycidae. It was described by Pic in 1941, originally as a varietas of the species Dorcadion mucidum. It is known from Spain.

See also 
Dorcadion

References

nigrosparsum
Beetles described in 1941